Diethard Tautz (born 17 August 1957 in Glonn) is a German biologist and geneticist, who is primarily concerned with the molecular basis of the evolution of mammals. Since 2006 he is director at the Max Planck Institute for Evolutionary Biology in Plön.

Life 
From 1976 to 1981, Tautz studied biology at the University of Frankfurt and at the University of Tübingen. He completed a doctorate in 1983 at the EMBL in Heidelberg and the Max Planck Institute in Tübingen. He spent two years as a postdoc in Cambridge / UK. From 1985 to 1987 he worked at the Max Planck Institute for Developmental Biology in Tübingen as a postdoc. After his habilitation in 1988 he worked as a research group leader at the Max Planck Institute for Developmental Biology until 1990. Tautz did a second habilitation at the University of Tübingen in molecular biology and then went on as a group leader at the Institute of Genetics of the University of Munich. In 1991 he was appointed professor at the Zoological Institute of the University of Munich in 1991, and at the Institute of Genetics at the University of Cologne in 1998. Since 2006 Tautz is a "Scientific Member" of the Max Planck Society and director at the Max Planck Institute for Evolutionary Biology in Plön.

Scientific contribution 
Tautz's research covers a broad interest area in the fields of molecular evolution and developmental genetics. His thesis dealt with the first generic description of simple sequences (now often called microsatellites). This work became later the basis for his development of the genetic fingerprinting technology that is nowadays used in paternity testing, forensics and population genetics and for which he obtained a broad patent. For his second postdoc phase in Tübingen, he switched to developmental genetics joining the groups around Herbert Jäckle and Christiane Nüsslein-Volhard. His work there focused on the molecular characterization of segmentation genes in Drosophila. He cloned and characterized the segmentation gene ‘'hunchback'’ and he developed the "whole mount" in situ hybridization technology that is nowadays used as the general standard technology for the spatial and temporal analysis of gene expression in embryos. Based on the work on segmentation processes in Drosophila, he developed a general interest in studying the evolution of segmentation processes, especially in the model system Tribolium and he was involved in generating the first full genome sequencing for this beetle species. He is considered to be one of the founders of the new field of evolution of developmental processes (often called Evo-Devo) and he was the first editor in chief of the journal Development Genes and Evolution. As professor for Zoology in Munich he expanded his interests into the fields of population genetics, speciation research and molecular phylogeny reconstruction. He studied the mechanisms of sympatric speciation of cichlids in crater lakes, hybrid speciation of sculpins in the Rhine system and was the first to show a sister group relationship between crustaceans and insects in the phylogeny of arthropods. With his move to the University of Cologne he started projects in comparative genomics, with a special focus on the evolution of new genes, which resulted in the discovery of de novo evolution of genes from non-coding sequences. Through studying a segmentation gene in insects, he found the first eukaryotic poly-cistronic peptide-coding gene. In Cologne he started also his current projects on the genetic basis of adaptations to new environmental conditions. He uses natural populations and subspecies of the house mouse (Mus musculus) as a model system for this work, which he analyses with methods from population genetics, comparative genomics and quantitative genetics.

Memberships 
From 2005 to 2006 Tautz was president of the German Zoological Society. Since 2009 he is president of the Association of Biology, Biosciences and Biomedicine in Germany (VBIO). He is an elected member of several scientific organisations and academies, for example European Molecular Biology Organization and the Deutsche Akademie der Naturforscher Leopoldina. He is also editor of scientific journals and, since 2012, senior editor of "eLIFE" and since 2014 senior editor of "Molecular Ecology".

Honors and awards 
 1990 Gerhard-Hess-Prize of the Deutsche Forschungsgemeinschaft (DFG)
 1995 
 2021 Order of Merit of the Federal Republic of Germany

Publications 
Research Gate Publication list

References

External links 
 Personal webpage of the Max Planck Institute in Plön 
 Mus musculus domesticus. Vortrag Speciation 2010 (YouTube)
 

1957 births
Living people
20th-century German biologists
German geneticists
21st-century German biologists
Officers Crosses of the Order of Merit of the Federal Republic of Germany
Max Planck Institute directors
Goethe University Frankfurt alumni
University of Tübingen alumni
Academic staff of the Ludwig Maximilian University of Munich
Academic staff of the University of Cologne
People from Ebersberg (district)